Ottawa is a name used by the US Navy twice:

 , was a gunboat during the American Civil War
 , was a  commissioned 8 February 1945 and decommissioned 10 January 1947

Ottawa